DWQZ (97.9 FM), broadcasting as 97.9 Home Radio, is a radio station owned and operated by Aliw Broadcasting Corporation through its licensee Insular Broadcasting System. Its studio is located at the 5th floor, Citystate Centre, 709 Shaw Blvd., Brgy. Oranbo, Pasig, and its transmitter is located at Nuestra Señora Dela Paz Subdivision, Sumulong Highway, Brgy. Santa Cruz, Antipolo (sharing facilities with sister station ALIW 23).

History

1994–2014: First easy listening era
97dot9 Home Radio started its broadcast in October 1994. Dubbed as the "#1 Easy Listening Station" in Metro Manila, it carried an easy listening format. After gaining success in half a year, it was then implemented to its provincial stations. Aside from its usual programming from Mondays to Saturdays, it aired a variety hits programming during Sundays.

In 2006, Home Radio introduced its first 24-hour fully automated DJ Jackie (voiced by Lannie Chan, who also worked as one of the female voiceovers for RPN 9). In 2009, it recruited female (and later, male) DJs on board, following the less talk, more music style.

On February 28, 2014, after 14 years, the Home Radio network bade goodbye to its easy listening format.

2014–2015: Masa era
On March 17, 2014, after two weeks of transition, the Home Radio network reformatted to a mass-based format, with a new slogan, "Natural!". Managed by Bryan "Idol T-Bone" Quitoriano, with the air team retained, they were named after fruits. OPM singers Jimmy Bondoc and Duncan Ramos from the Sabado Boys fame hosted their own radio program "The R&B Show: The Ramos and Bondoc Show" from July to December that year. In November 2014, the Home Radio branding was returned.

2015–2017: Top 40 era
On April 5, 2015, the station slowly shifted to a Top 40 format with an emphasis on OPM, simply known as CHR Local. At the helm of Migz Anzuares (of RT), it adapted the new positioner "Be You".

By the end of 2015, Home Radio shifted to a full-fledged Top 40 station with Braggy Braganza (of WLS-FM, MMDA Radio & DZSR) taking over the station's management. It dropped the slogan "Natural!" in favor of "The Music of Now" and the catchphrase "The Home Of the Millennials". The station also launched its student DJ search called "Aircheck 979", where various student DJs were tapped from different schools & universities around the country.

2017–present: Second easy listening era
On June 30, 2017, at 9am, Home Radio (now read as nine-seven-nine) abruptly discontinued its programming and returned to its original easy listening format with the slogan "It Feels Good to be Home". Along its reformat was a new jingle sung by Chi Bocobo (formerly Ces Datu). Braganza later stated that the sudden reformat was done in order to target a broader audience and to increase the station's sales.

Among its current programs are OPM Highlights, a Weekday noon program that features Original Pilipino Music; Totally 80s, a Weekday evening program that plays upbeat music from the 80s; Friday Night Live, a Friday evening program that features live performances; Hydrate, a Saturday program that plays variety hits from the 90s and 2000s; and Sunday All Day Classics, a Sunday program that plays easy listening music from the 70s through the 90s.

References

Adult contemporary radio stations in the Philippines
Aliw Broadcasting Corporation
Home Radio Network
Radio stations in Metro Manila
Radio stations established in 1994